The Taipei Story House, formerly known as the Yuanshan Mansion, is a historic house in Zhongshan District, Taipei, Taiwan. It is currently open as a museum in the Taipei Expo Park.

Overview
The house was built in 1913–14 during Japanese rule by Tan Tiau-chun (陳朝駿), a Daitōtei tea merchant.  It was originally a guest house for local dignitaries and overseas guests. 

The ground floor was built using brick and the upper floors of wood with English Tudor-style beams. The staircase is constructed to look like a pagoda. The gable above the entrance features stained glass in green, yellow and red. Two fireplaces can be found inside, with large numbers of Art Nouveau tiles and ceiling lamps with bas-relief floral patterns. 

The Story House museum now has exhibits related to tea and local history. It is located adjacent to the Taipei Fine Arts Museum and close to Yuanshan Station.

Transportation
The building is within walking north-east from the Yuanshan Station of the Taipei Metro.

Fares
There is a NT$50 fare for each person. Those under 6 or over 65 can enter free.

Opening Hours
The museum is open from 10:30 AM to 6:30 PM, from Tuesday to Saturday.

See also
 List of tourist attractions in Taiwan
 Taipei Futai Street Mansion
 Monopoly Bureau

References

External links 

 Taipei Story House website 
 Taipei Story House 

Houses completed in 1914
Museums in Taipei
Tourist attractions in Taipei
Houses in Taiwan
Historic house museums in Taiwan
Tea museums
Food museums in Taiwan
Local museums
History of Taipei
Chinese tea